The 1892 Cincinnati Reds season was a season in American baseball. The National League expanded to 12 teams in 1892, and it was announced that the season would be split into two halves, with the winners of each half meeting in a "World's Championship Series". The Reds finished with a combined record of 82–68, fifth-best in the National League, finishing in fourth place in the first half and in eighth place in the second half.

Regular season 
After a horrible 1891 season in which the Reds finished in a virtual tie for last place with a 56–81 record, the team fired manager Tom Loftus and replaced him with first baseman Charles Comiskey. Comiskey had previously been the player-manager of the St. Louis Browns of the American Association from 1883–89, leading the team to four straight pennants from 1885–88. He then was a player-manager with the Chicago Pirates of the Players' League in 1890, leading them to a fourth-place finish, followed by a return to the Browns in 1891, where he led them to a second-place finish with a record of 86–52.

The Reds acquired outfielder Tip O'Neill during the off-season, as he spent the 1891 season with Comiskey with the Browns, hitting .323 with ten homers and 95 RBI for the club. O'Neill's best season was in 1887 with the Browns, when he hit .435, with 225 hits, 167 runs, 52 doubles, nineteen triples, fourteen home runs and 123 RBI, all of which led the American Association. Catcher Morgan Murphy was picked by from the Boston Reds of the AA. Murphy hit .216 with four homers and 54 RBI in 106 games. Another catcher, Farmer Vaughn, was signed after he split the 1891 season between the Cincinnati Kelly's Killers and Milwaukee Brewers of the AA. Vaughn hit .285 with a homer and 23 RBI between the two clubs. Pitcher Ice Box Chamberlain also signed with the Reds after posting a 22–23 record with a 4.22 with the Philadelphia Athletics of the AA.

Bug Holliday once again was the Reds offensive leader, hitting .294 with a team high thirteen home runs and 91 RBI. Bid McPhee hit .274 with four homers and 60 RBI and 44 stolen bases, while Germany Smith hit .243 with eight homers and 63 RBI. On the mound, Tony Mullane led the staff with a 21–13 record and a 2.59 ERA, while Chamberlain had a 19–23 record with a 3.39 ERA in a team high 49 starts.

Season summary 
In the first half of the season, the Reds started off strong and found themselves in the middle of the pennant race, sitting with a 26–16 record and in third place in the league, 4.5 games out of first, before they tallied off, finishing in fourth place with a 44–31 record, 8½ games behind the Boston Beaneaters. In the second half, the Reds were mediocre, as they finished in eighth place with a 38–37 record, 14½ games behind the Cleveland Spiders. They finished the season with a combined record of 82–68, which marked a big improvement over the previous year.

Season standings

Record vs. opponents

Roster

Player stats

Batting

Starters by position 
Note: Pos = Position; G = Games played; AB = At bats; H = Hits; Avg. = Batting average; HR = Home runs; RBI = Runs batted in

Other batters 
Note: G = Games played; AB = At bats; H = Hits; Avg. = Batting average; HR = Home runs; RBI = Runs batted in

Pitching

Starting pitchers 
Note: G = Games pitched; IP = Innings pitched; W = Wins; L = Losses; ERA = Earned run average; SO = Strikeouts

Relief pitchers 
Note: G = Games pitched; W = Wins; L = Losses; SV = Saves; ERA = Earned run average; SO = Strikeouts

References

External links
1892 Cincinnati Reds season at Baseball Reference

Cincinnati Reds seasons
1892 in sports in Ohio
Cincinnati Reds season